Renaldo Gouws (born 20 May 1983) is a South African politician for the Democratic Alliance (DA), Spokesperson for Economic Development. Tourism and Agriculture in Nelson Mandela Bay, a Member to Provincial Council in the Eastern Cape for the DA and an Industrial Psychologist.

Early life and education 
Gouws was born in the small town of Uitenhage, Eastern Cape, and attended Hoërskool Brandwag. He furthered his education at the Nelson Mandela University. He obtained his Masters Degree in Industrial Psychology in 2010. He currently does consultation work as an Industrial Psychologist.

Political career 
Gouws joined the DA in 2012. His political career began when he became the branch chairperson of Ward 2 in Nelson Mandela Bay in 2012. Gouws graduated in 2012 from the Provincial Young Leaders Program and the National Young Leadership Program in 2013. In 2016 he ranked high enough on the PR list for the DA to secure a seat for the Nelson Mandela Municipality Council. In 2019 a vacancy opened up in Ward 2 of Nelson Mandela Bay and after becoming the successful candidate  for the ward the DA managed to obtain 94% of the vote in the by-election.

Gouws still serves in this capacity for the DA in Nelson Mandela Bay. Gouws was also elected to serve as the Spokesperson for Economic Development, Tourism and Agriculture for the DA in Nelson Mandela Bay. He has served in this position from 2019 when Athol Trollip resigned as the caucus leader for the DA in Nelson Mandela Bay and was replaced by Jonothan Lawack who compiled his spokespeople to lead the DA from the opposition benches.

During the COVID-19 pandemic, Gouws with his caucus leadership formulated a plan that would assist in turning the metro around. Some elements of this plan have been adopted by the ANC government in the metro. Gouws was elected as a Member of the Provincial Council during the DA Eastern Cape's Virtual Congress. It was the first time any political party in Africa had its congress via digital means.

Andile Lungisa Jug Incident (2016) 
During a council meeting in Nelson Mandela Bay in 2016, a brawl broke out that lead to glass jugs being thrown around injuring people. Andile Lungisa broke a glass jug over a fellow councillors head and was arrested for Grievous bodily harm. The footage of the incident was taken by Gouws which lead to a successful conviction. Andile Lungisa has however referred the matter back to the court in order to appeal his sentence but is not allowed to appeal his judgement. On the 9th of September 2020 the Supreme Court of Appeals read out their verdict and they upheld the previous sentencing from the initial court judgement that means that he will be serving 2 years in jail with the 3rd year being suspended. He started serving his two year jail term on the 17th of September 2020 at the Port Elizabeth Correctional Centre in North End. He has however appealed to the Constitutional Court to overturn his sentence but not his conviction.

Social media 
Gouws is often quoted by mainstream media outlets regarding his opinion on pertinent topics in South Africa. He is known for his YouTube channel which he started in 2009. His videos focus on current events in South Africa and mostly focus on the political aspect of South Africa. He also does a debate show which is called the Sunday Service, in which he speaks to senior politicians, celebrities and thought leaders about South Africa. Gouws has been accused of racism.

References

Democratic Alliance (South Africa) politicians
1983 births
People from Uitenhage
Nelson Mandela University alumni
Living people